Dr. K. A. Manoharan (born 21 February 1951) is an Indian politician and was elected in as a Member of Tamil Nadu Legislative Assembly from Hosur constituency. He has also served as the President of the Hosur municipality in 1978. He is the eldest son of late K. Appavu Pillai. He is currently the Working President of Tamilnadu INTUC  and National Secretary of Indian National Trade Union Congress (INTUC).

Early life and family 

K.A. Manoharan is the eldest son of veteran politician Mr. K. Appavu Pillai and Mrs. Ponnammal, was born in Hosur on 21 February 1951. Manoharan is married to Banumathi and has two children. He Studied in PSG College of Arts and Science, Coimbatore and completed his bachelor degree. K.A Manoharan has been conferred Honorary Doctorates by the National Virtue University of Peace and Education in March 2019.

Politics 
Manoharan was elected as the President of Hosur Town Panchayat at the age of 22.  He has been a member of the Indian National Congress since 1990.

In 1991, he was elected to the Tamil Nadu Legislative Assembly from Hosur constituency.

He is a member of the Indian National Trade Union Congress (INTUC) and a National General Secretary of the Indian National Trade Union Congress (INTUC) from 2019.

Elections contested

Positions held 
 Former Member Of Legislative Assembly For Hosur (1991 - 1996).
 Working President Of Tamilnadu INTUC (Indian National Trade Union Congress).
 National Secretary Of Indian National Trade Union Congress. 
 Vice President of Tamilnadu National Electricity Workers Federation.
 President Of Krishnagiri Historical Research Center.
 President of Hosur Tamil Valartchi Mandram.
 Vice President Of Madras Film Society.

References 

Indian National Congress politicians from Tamil Nadu
Tamil Nadu MLAs 1991–1996
1951 births
Living people
People from Krishnagiri district